The Slana Roadhouse, on Nabesna Road in Slana, Alaska, in the Valdez-Cordova Census Area, is a historic site dating to 1928. The site was listed on the National Register of Historic Places in 2005.

The building replaced a smaller, older roadhouse building. The community of Slana grew around it, and, in 2004, included a post office, an elementary school, stores, and more with a population of 50–100.
It was deemed significant of one of few surviving pre-World War II roadside stops that used to be located about 30 miles apart on the Nabesna Road and other remote roadways in Alaska. The roadhouse operated from 1928 to 1953 when the Glenn Highway was relocated to about a mile away;  in 2004 it was a residence of Lawrence DeWitt's son.

See also
National Register of Historic Places listings in Copper River Census Area, Alaska

References

1928 establishments in Alaska
Buildings and structures on the National Register of Historic Places in Copper River Census Area, Alaska
Commercial buildings on the National Register of Historic Places in Alaska
Historic districts on the National Register of Historic Places in Alaska
Hotel buildings completed in 1928
Hotel buildings on the National Register of Historic Places in Alaska
Log buildings and structures on the National Register of Historic Places in Alaska